The barred laughingthrush (Ianthocincla lunulata) is a passerine bird in the family Leiothrichidae. It is endemic to central China where its natural habitat is temperate forests.

The barred laughingthrush was at one time placed in the genus Garrulax but following the publication of a comprehensive molecular phylogenetic study in 2018, it was moved to the resurrected genus Ianthocincla.

References

barred laughingthrush
Birds of Central China
Endemic birds of China
barred laughingthrush
Taxonomy articles created by Polbot
Taxobox binomials not recognized by IUCN